Jiang Xindi, nicknamed "Cindy" (born January 26, 1997, in Harbin, China) is a Chinese female curler. She was part of the Chinese women's curling team on 2018 Winter Olympics.

Career
Jiang competed at the 2018 Winter Olympics in PyeongChang, where the Chinese team participated in the women's curling tournament. She competed at the 2018 World Women's Curling Championship where her team placed seventh. Jiang also won the bronze medal at the 2017 and 2018 Pacific-Asia Curling Championships and the silver medal at the 2013 and 2015 Pacific-Asia Junior Curling Championships.

To start the 2019–20 season, Jiang and her team won the World Curling Tour event, the 2019 Hokkaido Bank Curling Classic. She represented China at the 2019 Pacific-Asia Curling Championships as second for Han Yu. After going 6–1 in the round robin, they defeated Korea and Japan in the semifinal and final, respectively, to claim the title. It was China's first title since 2014. The victory earned a spot for China at the 2020 World Women's Curling Championship, which was cancelled due to COVID-19. A year later, the team represented China at the 2021 World Women's Curling Championship, finishing tenth with a 6–7 record.

Teams

Private life
Jiang became involved in curling when her grandfather, middle school physics teacher Jiang Fang opened a curling club after he was inspired watching curling on TV broadcasting from 2006 Olympics in Turin. Many from her family plays curling too.

She is niece of competitive Chinese female curler Jiang Yilun, they are teammates for today.

References

External links

 Video: 

1997 births
Living people
Chinese female curlers
Curlers at the 2018 Winter Olympics
Olympic curlers of China
Sportspeople from Harbin
Pacific-Asian curling champions
Curlers at the 2022 Winter Olympics
21st-century Chinese women